The Vercors Massif is a range in France consisting of rugged plateaus and mountains straddling the départements of Isère and Drôme in the French Prealps. It lies west of the Dauphiné Alps, from which it is separated by the rivers Drac and Isère. The cliffs at the massif's eastern limit face the city of Grenoble.

Background

Over time, various features of the complex geography have been recognised including, the Quatre Montagnes (four mountains), the Coulmes (gorges), the Vercors Drômois (Drome Vercors), the Hauts-Plateaux (high plateaus) and, in the foothills, Royans, Gervanne, Diois, and Trièves.

The massif is sometimes called the "fortress." The movement of people tends to be between the massif and the surrounding plains rather than between the various parts of the massif itself.

Until the mid twentieth century, the name Vercors was used to describe only the township of La Chapelle-en-Vercors (with Royans), and the northern area around Lans-en-Vercors, Villard-de-Lans, Autrans, and Méaudre (with Grenoble) and was known as the Four Mountains area.

In June and July 1944, the massif became important in World War II with the establishment of the Free Republic of Vercors, led by the Maquis du Vercors, a base for the French Resistance against German occupation.

The Vercors includes the largest alpine karst area in the Northern French pre-alps, and contains a number of large and deep cave systems.

The Vercors has several resorts for cross-country skiing and for down-hill skiing. Villard-de-Lans is the biggest down-hill ski resort.

This sporting area is environmentally protected, and although the natural environment has been drastically altered throughout history for the purposes of agriculture and forestry, plans for afforestation will make it one of the major forests of Metropolitan France and a reserve for species such as the southern tulip and black grouse, two symbols of the park, as well as the re-introduced griffon vulture and the alpine ibex. The differences in climate and altitude across the Vercors are reflected in the high level of diversity in the fauna and flora.

Etymology
The name Massif du Vercors is derived from the name of a local tribe who lived in the area at the time of the Roman conquest of Gaul, who were known as the Vertamocorii (also spelled Vertamocori, Vertacomicorii, or Vertacomocorii), meaning excellent troops or troops of the summit. Modern inhabitants are referred to as Vertacomiriens.

Prior to the 1900s, the name Vercors referred to the upper valleys of the Vernaison near the township of La Chapelle-en-Vercors. At the beginning of the 20th century, Henri Ferrand explored the massif, taking numerous photographs, publishing books, and describing the geology of the mountains. Ferrand was the first to use the term Vercors in its contemporary sense. The geographers Raoul Blanchard and Jules Blache, popularised the term in the late 1920s and early 1930s. By the 1950s, the term was ubiquitous.

Geography

Location

The massif is surrounded by the Chartreuse Mountains to the north, the Matheysine area of the Dauphiné Alps to the east, and the Diois Massif to the south. In the far south-east, the massif joins with the  col de Menée.

The massif is drained in the north-east and the north-west by the Isère, in the east by the Drac, and in the south by the Drôme. The western side overlooks the Rhône Valley.

Topography

Geomorphology

The Vercors Massif is known as the fortress or as the French dolomites because of its geomorphology.

The massif also has wide valleys including the valley of Lans-en-Vercors, the regions around Autrans, and La Chapelle-en-Vercors, and plateaus including forêt des Coulmes, forêt de Lente, and the high plateau. There are a number of deeply incised gorges, including the Bourne and Furon Gorges. These have imposing cliffs often exceeding  such as the Combe Laval and the Cirque d'Archiane.

Mont Aiguille stands apart from the rest of the massif as the result of erosion. Other parts are isolated from the rest of the massif due to its relief. For example, to reach Gresse-en-Vercors in the south, one must travel  via the col de Rousset or journey  via Saint-Nizier-du-Moucherotte in the north. The villages at the far northern end were isolated by a landslide near the Mortier tunnel. Another example is the Peuil plateau in the east. During the Ice Age, the Grésivaudan glacier reached the Peuil plateau leaving a marsh.

Sub-divisions

The central part of the Vercors Massif is divided into several regions.

The Coulmes, in the north-west, are heavily covered in forest. Folds of Urgonian limestone are rounded, making the area appear mountainous.

The four mountains area has been developed for tourism and skiing but is also known for its traditional activities such as the breeding of dairy cows and cheese making. The main villages, Autrans, Méaudre, Lans-en-Vercors, and Villard-de-Lans, are spread over two plateaus covered by wooded hills.

The Drômois Vercors is an area made up of a number of smaller plateaus. In the north of the Drômois Vercors there are several gorges which are traversed by roads cut into the cliffs. Grassy areas are used as pastures in the summer months, and the biannual migration (transhumance) of animals is a period of celebration for the people of Die.

The Haut-Plateaux (high plateaus) are the highest wilderness areas of the massif. The area is managed and the pastures are used for grazing in the summer.

At the fringes of the massif, the Vercors regional park has four geographical areas. The Royans, the north-west foothills are the location of walnuts growing. Three valleys descend to the edge of the Royans: the Gorges de la Bourne, the cirque of the  Combe Laval, and the Échevis valley, including the Grands and the Petits Goulets.

The Gervanne, in the south-west, is a rugged area of hills at the foot of the plateau, with picturesque villages. It looks towards Crest.

The Diois is a part of the Drôme valley around Die. This region has a Mediterranean character, with vineyards and fields of lavender. It acts as a buffer between Gervanne and the interior of the massif.

The Trièves, in the east, is a low hilly plateau, which lies between the highest summits of the Vercors and the gorge carved out by the Drac.

Principal summits

From north to south:
 Le Moucherotte,  m, the summit which dominates Grenoble, most northerly of the massif
 Le Pic Saint-Michel,  m
 Roc Cornafion,  m
 Les Arêtes du Gerbier,  m
 La Grande Moucherolle,  m
 La Petite Moucherolle,  m
 La Tête des Chaudières,  m
 Les Rochers de la Balme,  m
 Le Sommet de Malaval,  m
 Le Grand Veymont,  m, highest point of the massif
 Le Mont Aiguille,  m, with its characteristic silhouette, its first ascent in 1492 was the birth of alpinism
 Le Dôme ou Pié Ferré,  m, to the east of Die, in the Glandasse uplands.

Principal road cols
By descending altitude:
 Col du Mont Noir,  m, between Malleval-en-Vercors and Rencurel
 Col de l'Allimas,  m, between Gresse-en-Vercors and Saint-Michel-les-Portes
 Col de la Chau,  m, between Vassieux-en-Vercors and Bouvante
 Col de la Bataille,  m, between Léoncel and Bouvante
 Col de Rousset,  m (tunnel altitude), between Die and Saint-Agnan-en-Vercors
 Col de Saint-Alexis,  m, between Vassieux-en-Vercors and Saint-Agnan-en-Vercors 
 Col de la Croix-Perrin,  m, between Lans-en-Vercors and Autrans - Méaudre 
 Col de Carri,  m, between La Chapelle-en-Vercors and  Bouvante 
 Col de la Portette,  m, in Bouvante
 Col de l'Arzelier,  m, between Château-Bernard and Le Gua
 Col de Tourniol,  m, between Léoncel and Barbières
 Col de Proncel,  m, between Vassieux-en-Vercors and La Chapelle-en-Vercors
 Col des Limouches,  m, between Léoncel and Peyrus
 Col de Romeyère,  m, between Rencurel and Saint-Gervais
 Col de la Machine,  m, between Saint-Jean-en-Royans and Bouvante.

It was closed on 20 April 1992 after a landslide of 20,000 m3 of rock which involved part of the slope to the north of the route. The instability of the slopes have proved an impediment for the realisation of further work below the site, particularly work on the gorges d'Engins to Sassenage road, the D531.

Principal caves

The commune in which the cave is situated is given in italics.

The Grotte de Bournillon, located in the commune of Châtelus, has the highest cave opening in Europe (418 meters).

Climate
The climate of the Vercors due to its elevation is much more rigorous than the lowlands surrounding the massif.  The village of La-Chapelle-en-Vercors, approximately in the center of the massif, has a Dfb climate under the Köppen Classification system. Winters are cold; summers are warm; and precipitation, often snow in the winter, is abundant in all seasons.

Geology
The constituent rocks of the Vercors were formed by sedimentation about 165 million years ago, in the middle Jurassic period, at the bottom of the Piemont-Liguria Ocean. The deposition of animal material formed limestone, with detritus rocks, formed primarily from the erosion of marl from the Variscan orogeny formed the massif in a period marked by changing climatic conditions and ocean depth. At Diois and Trièves is a layer of the massif, formed in the Tithonian age. 
Then, about 130 million years ago, in the Cretaceous period, a rise in temperatures combined with shallow waters led to the development of coral reefs, which abounded with molluscs, particularly rudists. These were the origin of the Urgonian Limestone which forms the upper part of the massif, more prominently in the northern half. This primitive fauna left numerous fossils, some of which have been found at a site near Rencurel in the Coulmes.

In the Paleogene period, the Tethys ocean closed up and at the start of the Miocene, the raising of the Alps involved the thrusting of a nappe to the west.

Subsequent marine transgressions were responsible for secondary sedimentation in the basins. There was widening of the gorges and erosion of the cliffs from runoff, leading to the formation of the molasse in the Royans and also in the valleys of Lans, Autrans, and Rencurel. At the close of the Miocene, a new period of uplifting brought about the final receding of the sea.

Once formed, the massif underwent severe erosion, which accentuated the relief. The different synclines grew larger, eventually forming valleys including those of Autrans, Méaudre and Lans, Villard, Corrençon, the Col de Romeyère and the Col de Rousset. The water hollowed out the cirque of Archiane, the steephead valley of Bournillon, and the Combe Laval.

Vercors in popular culture
The Vercors have appeared in many films, including;
 La Bride sur le cou (1961)
 Wish Me Luck (1987) Season 3
 Une hirondelle a fait le printemps (2001)
 The Butterfly (2002)
 To Paint or Make Love (2006)
 My son (2017)

See also
 Battle of Vercors

References

Sources
 (in French).

Dauphiné Prealps
Plateaus of Metropolitan France
Landforms of Drôme
Mountains of Isère
Landforms of Auvergne-Rhône-Alpes